Charlie Bales (born October 22, 1991) is an American soccer player for the Iowa Demon Hawks in Major Arena Soccer League 2. He is also the co-general manager of the Des Moines Menace of USL League Two and a commentator for home games of the Drake Bulldogs men's soccer team.

Career

College and Amateur
Bales spent his entire college career at Western Illinois University.  He made a total of 72 appearances for the Leathernecks and tallied 11 goals and 10 assists.

He also played in the Premier Development League for Des Moines Menace.

Professional
Bales joined USL expansion club Charlotte Independence for the 2015 season.  On March 27, he made his professional debut in a 3–2 defeat to Charleston Battery.

References

External links
Des Moines Menace staff page
Western Illinois player profile
Western Illinois coaching profile

1991 births
Living people
American soccer players
Western Illinois Leathernecks men's soccer players
Des Moines Menace players
Charlotte Independence players
Association football defenders
Soccer players from Iowa
Sportspeople from Cedar Rapids, Iowa
USL League Two players
USL Championship players
Major Arena Soccer League players
Western Illinois Leathernecks men's soccer coaches
High school football players in the United States
American football placekickers